Colin George Windsor FRS (born 28 June 1938) is a British physicist, and was Programme Area Manager, for the United Kingdom Atomic Energy Authority

Life

He was born in London and attended Beckenham and Penge Grammar School. He won a scholarship to Magdalen College, Oxford, earning a BA with First Class Honours in Physics, and a DPhil in 1963.

He conducted Magnetic resonance research, at Clarendon Laboratory in 1963. He was Resident Fellow at Yale University in 1964.
He conducted Neutron scattering research, at the Atomic Energy Research Establishment, from 1964 to 1996.

He won the Duddell Medal and Prize in 1987.

He was elected a Fellow of the Royal Society in 1995

Works
Pulsed Neutron Scattering, Taylor & Francis, 1981, 
Four computer models for the ZX81 micro-computer, C.G. Windsor, 1983, 
D. L. Weaire, Colin G. Windsor (eds) Solid state science: past, present, and predicted, A. Hilger, 1987,

References

External links
webpage
https://colin-windsor.github.io/HomePage/sciencestory/ScienceStory.htm
http://seefurtherfestival.org/exhibition/view/looking-buried-land-mines-holographic-radar
http://www.ingentaconnect.com/content/bindt/insight/2005/00000047/00000007/art00004

1938 births
Academics of the University of Oxford
Fellows of the Royal Society
British physicists
Living people